The Building at 923–925 Michigan Avenue is a historic apartment building in Evanston, Illinois. The three-story brick building was built in 1916. Architect Robert De Golyer, the architect for several other apartment buildings in Evanston and Chicago, designed the building, moving in once it was complete. The building features bow windows, pilasters and a fanlight around the entrance, and a dentillated cornice. Each of the building's six apartments included living rooms with fireplaces, sun porches, maids' rooms, vacuum systems, and access to heated garages.

The building was added to the National Register of Historic Places on March 15, 1984.

References

Buildings and structures on the National Register of Historic Places in Cook County, Illinois
Residential buildings on the National Register of Historic Places in Illinois
Buildings and structures in Evanston, Illinois
Apartment buildings in Illinois
Residential buildings completed in 1916